Nkalagu is a town in Ishielu Local Government Area of Ebonyi State, Nigeria.  It is notable for having a large deposit of limestone which provided the raw material for the large cement plant of the Nigerian Cement Company (Nigercem).
Nkalagu is the first town you will enter, when you are going into Ebonyi State through Enugu-Abakaliki express road. It is the headquarters of Ishielu West Development Centre  and has five major villages: Ishiagu, Uwule, Imeoha, Amanvu and Akiyi. The village head in Nkalagu is also known as Onyishi. Each village has its own Onyishi which must be the most eldest son of the town. The major market is Nkwo Nkalagu which is located along Enugu-Abakaliki Express road.

Origin of Nkalagu

Nkalagu was second son of Odeke who migrated from Nkanu and settled around the present Amazu Town. Odeke gave birth to Amazu Odeke and Nkalagu Odeke the second son. Nkalagu was a hunter and traveled from place to place hunting. After hunting each day he usually went home to his father's house until he found the present place called Nkalagu. He settled there and sent message to his family that he had found a fertile place and would settle there with his family and would never come home again.

References

Towns in Nigeria